Hokes Mill Covered Bridge is a historic covered bridge at Ronceverte, Greenbrier County, West Virginia. It was built over Second Creek between 1897 and 1899, and measures 12 feet wide and 81.6 feet long. It has red board-and-batten siding and a standing seam metal roof. It is one of two remaining covered bridges in Greenbrier County, the other being Herns Mill Covered Bridge.

It was listed on the National Register of Historic Places in 1981.

Further reading 

 Hokes Mill Covered Bridge at Bridges & Tunnels

References

See also
List of covered bridges in West Virginia

Covered bridges on the National Register of Historic Places in West Virginia
Buildings and structures in Greenbrier County, West Virginia
Bridges completed in 1899
Transportation in Greenbrier County, West Virginia
National Register of Historic Places in Greenbrier County, West Virginia
1899 establishments in West Virginia
Road bridges on the National Register of Historic Places in West Virginia
Wooden bridges in West Virginia
Long truss bridges in the United States